Avrillé is a commune in the Vendée department in the Pays de la Loire region in western France.

The 16th-century Château de la Guignardière is located just outside the town.

See also
Communes of the Vendée department

References

Communes of Vendée